A Fatal Grace, by Louise Penny, published in Canada as Dead Cold, is the second novel in the Three Pines Mysteries series, which feature Inspector Armand Gamache.

Plot summary

Inspector Gamache investigates after CC de Poitiers, a sadistic socialite, is fatally electrocuted at a Christmas curling competition in the small Québécois town of Three Pines.  CC, who had a "spiritual guidance" business based on eliminating emotion, was hated by seemingly everyone, including her husband, lover, and daughter.  The crime links to a vagrant's recent murder as well as to the pasts of several other villagers.

Awards and recognition

A Fatal Grace was the recipient of the Agatha Award for best novel of 2007.

References

External links
 A Fatal Grace Official Macmillan Page
 Review by The New York Times
 Review by The Library Journal
 Review by The Houston Chronicle

2007 Canadian novels
Novels by Louise Penny
Agatha Award-winning works
Novels set in Quebec